Better Tomorrow is a studio album by a Jamaican reggae female singer, Etana, released on February 18, 2013, under VP Records. "Etana" will return in 2013 with a scorching new reggae set of 14 new songs about life, love and reggae. "Better Tomorrow" is fully rooted in the one drop reggae style that made Etana’s name. The album is produced by Shane Brown of Jukeboxx Productions (Busy Signal) and showcases the talents of some of Jamaica’s top studio musicians and legendary engineer Errol Brown.

Executive Producer
Chris Chin

Discography

References
 

 http://www.vpreggae.com/BETTER-TOMORROW-ETANA-p/vp1950.2.htm. VPreggae. February 26, 2013.
 http://www.jamaicaobserver.com/entertainment/Etana-hopes-for-a-Better-Tomorrow_13127024. Jamaica Observer. December 2, 2012.
 http://jamaica-gleaner.com/latest/article.php?id=42478. Jamaica Gleaner. January 26, 2013.
 http://themalaika.com/2013/02/02/etana-gives-fans-a-taste-of-a-better-tomorrow/. TheMalaika.com. February 2, 2013.
 http://tropicalfete.com/?p=4592. Tropicalfete.com. January 11. 2013.
http://www.zimbio.com/Caribbean+Entertainment+News/articles/PMXAXbxtZ7e/ETANA+envisions+BETTER+TOMORROW+2013+New+Studio. Zimbio. January 10, 2013.
 https://web.archive.org/web/20130116181131/http://caribbeancelebs.com/2013/01/14/etanas-better-tomorrow-drops-february-26/. CaribbeanCelebs. January 14, 2013.
 http://jamaicanewsbulletin.com/entertainment.html. JaBulletin. October 28, 2012.

Etana (musician) albums
2013 albums